The lists below show notable Thoroughbred horse races in various countries around the world. In countries with a grading system, the included races are normally Group or Grade 1. However, some restricted races such as the Queen's Plate in Canada are also included, and all races at the Royal Ascot festival are included because of their prestige.

Flat races

Steeplechases

See also
Flat racing
Horse racing
National Hunt racing
Steeplechase
Thoroughbred racing

 
Lists of sports events